Mahmud Celaleddin Pasha (1839 – 1899) was an Ottoman liberal statesman during the first constitutional period of the Ottoman Empire, who served as the Minister of Justice.

References 

1839 births
1899 deaths
Political people from the Ottoman Empire
Georgians from the Ottoman Empire